Robert Markham was a pseudonym for novelist Kingsley Amis.

Robert Markham may also refer to:

 Robert Markham, Mayor of Reading 1402 and 1407
 Robert Markham (MP) (1536–1606), MP for Grantham and Nottinghamshire
 Sir Robert Markham, 2nd Baronet (1644–1690), English politician
 Robert Markham (priest) (1768–1837), Archdeacon of York
 Robert Markham (game designer), American wargame designer